Marshall is a city in Kusilvak Census Area, Alaska, United States. At the 2010 census the population was 414, up from 349 in 2000.

Geography

Demographics

The predecessor village to Marshall first appeared on the 1880 U.S. Census as the Inuit village of "Ooglovia." It was also known as Uglovaia. It would not appear again on the census. Marshall first appeared on the 1940 U.S. Census as the unincorporated village of Fortuna Ledge. In 1950, the name was changed to Marshall. It continued to return as Marshall in 1960 and 1970, but in the latter year incorporated as the city of Fortuna Ledge. It reported as Fortuna Ledge on the 1980 census, but the city reverted to the name of Marshall in 1984. It has continued to report as Marshall since the 1990 census.

As of the census of 2000, there were 349 people, 91 households, and 73 families residing in the city. There were 104 housing units at an average density of 22.0 per square mile (8.5/km2). The racial makeup of the city was 2.01% White, 95.99% Alaska Native or Native American, and 2.01% from two or more races.  0.29% of the population were Hispanic or Latino of any race.

There were 91 households, out of which 59.3% had children under the age of 18 living with them, 48.4% were married couples living together, 22.0% had a female householder with no husband present, and 18.7% were non-families. 15.4% of all households were made up of individuals, and 1.1% had someone living alone who was 65 years of age or older.  The average household size was 3.84 and the average family size was 4.23.

In the city, the age distribution of the population shows 45.3% under the age of 18, 9.7% from 18 to 24, 23.5% from 25 to 44, 17.5% from 45 to 64, and 4.0% who were 65 years of age or older.  The median age was 22 years. For every 100 females, there were 100.6 males.  For every 100 females age 18 and over, there were 107.6 males.

The median income for a household in the city was $32,917, and the median income for a family was $37,750. Males had a median income of $25,469 versus $37,917 for females. The per capita income for the city was $9,597.  About 20.8% of families and 28.6% of the population were below the poverty line, including 32.7% of those under age 18 and 20.0% of those age 65 or over.

History
Marshall's previous name, changed in 1984, from Fortuna Ledge, was a mining village in the 1800s and early 1900s, with mining operations in Wilson Creek, just down river from the Ledge. With that, many Alaska Natives were moved from other villages, as far away as Unalakleet, Ohogamuit and Takchak. With that, there are two main Native groups, the Yupik descendants, hailing from both Takchak and Ohogamuit, and the Inupiaq descendants, hailing from Unalakleet. Along with those of Native descent, Marshall hosts a population of people of Russian descendant mixed with Inupiaqs and has become a Yup'ik/Inupiaq/Russian community. Marshall was reportedly named for Vice-president Thomas Riley Marshall, who served from 1913 to 1921.

Education
K-12 students attend Marshall School, operated by the Lower Yukon School District.

References

External links
 YukonAlaska.com - Marshall, Fortuna Ledge and the Mining of Willow Creek
 Alaska Division of Community Advocacy - Community Information Summary 
 https://web.archive.org/web/20080706203218/http://www.yukonking.com/aboutus.html

Cities in Alaska
Cities in Kusilvak Census Area, Alaska
Yukon River